Barbertown is an unincorporated community located within Kingwood Township in Hunterdon County, New Jersey, United States.

History
Isaac Barber opened a tavern in the settlement in 1823.  The tavern sign was a new moon.

In 1881, it was noted that Barbertown had a blacksmith shop, two stores, six dwellings, and a population of 90.

References

Kingwood Township, New Jersey
Unincorporated communities in Hunterdon County, New Jersey
Unincorporated communities in New Jersey